Francis D'Oyly may refer to:

 Francis D'Oyly (British Army general) (c. 1750–1803), British Army officer of the French Revolutionary Wars
 Francis D'Oyly (British Army officer, died 1815) (1776–1815), British Army officer killed at Waterloo, nephew of the above